These are the list of results that England have played from 1980 to 1989.

1980 
Scores and results list England's points tally first.

1981 
Scores and results list England's points tally first.

1982 
Scores and results list England's points tally first.

1983 
Scores and results list England's points tally first.

1984 
Scores and results list England's points tally first.

1985 
Scores and results list England's points tally first.

1986 
Scores and results list England's points tally first.

1987 
Scores and results list England's points tally first.

1988 
Scores and results list England's points tally first.

1989 
Scores and results list England's points tally first.

Year Box 

1980–89
1979–80 in English rugby union
1980–81 in English rugby union
1981–82 in English rugby union
1982–83 in English rugby union
1983–84 in English rugby union
1984–85 in English rugby union
1985–86 in English rugby union
1986–87 in English rugby union
1987–88 in English rugby union
1988–89 in English rugby union